The Sports Clubs of the Armed Forces, Physical Culture and Sports Association of the Soviet Armed Forces ( sportivnye kluby Armiy, SKA; , Fizkulturno-sportivnoe obyedinenie Vooruzhonnykh Sil SSSR), also called the Sports Clubs of the Soviet Ministry of Defense or simply Armed Forces or Army were a system of departmental sports clubs and one of the largest sports societies in the USSR.

Established at first within officers' clubs of the Red Army, after the Second World War they were reformed into sports clubs for all ranks in the armed forces. All the sports clubs were supervised by the Sports Committee of the Ministry of Defence of the USSR and the sports committees of military districts and naval fleets, with each district and fleet having its own club. The army clubs were often abbreviated as SKA and previously as SKVO and DO. The largest club was located in Moscow, CSKA Moscow ("C" standing for Central). The military sports clubs had an opportunity to enlist all top athletes of a country due to the mandatory conscription policies in force then.

Alongside the SKA teams in the Soviet Army, each service branch of the Armed Forces maintained service-wide clubs, with component teams coming under district or fleet club supervision.

Following the World War II, there was an acute competitiveness in all types of sports (i.e. football, ice hockey, basketball, etc.) between the Soviet Armed Forces Sports Association clubs and the clubs of the Dynamo representing Soviet security forces (MVD and KGB).

Regional multi-sport clubs 

 CSKA Moscow ("central" [main] club of the army)
 football section as PFC CSKA in Soviet Top League
 ice hockey section as HC CSKA in Soviet Higher League
 VVS Moscow (smaller Moscow club of the Air Forces)
 football section
 basketball section, won the 1951–52 Soviet Top League in basketball
 SKA Leningrad 
 ice hockey section
 Rostov-on-Don (football)
 Khabarovsk (bandy)
 Yekaterinburg (bandy)

 SKA Kiev, converted to the Central Sports Club of the Armed Forces of Ukraine
 football section, contributed to appearance of FC Arsenal Kiev, disbanded in 2009
 SKA Odessa, converted to the Odesa city's sport club in 1992
 football section, merged with FC Chornomorets Odesa
 SKA Lvov, disbanded
 football section, moved to Drohobych and transformed into FC Halychyna Drohobych

 SKA Alma-Ata, disbanded
basketball section, moved to Samara and merged with a local club into CSK VVS Samara

Medal recipients of the Armed Forces sports society at Olympics
City represented and sports discipline are given in parentheses.

Summer Olympics

1952 Summer Olympics
 Yuriy Lituyev (Leningrad, athletics)
 Boris Tokarev (Leningrad, athletics)
 Anatoly Konev (Moscow, basketball)
 Aleksandr Moiseyev (Moscow, basketball)
 Arkady Vorobyov (Sverdlovsk, weightlifting)
 Dmytro Leonkin, Lviv (gymnastics)
 Dmytro Leonkin, Lviv (gymnastics)

1956 Summer Olympics
 Yuriy Lituyev (Moscow, athletics)
 Yevgeniy Maskinskov (Saransk, athletics)
 Semyon Rzhishchin (Moscow, athletics)
 Boris Tokarev (Moscow, athletics)
 Viktor Tsybulenko (Kiev, athletics)
 Vladimir Safronov (Chita, boxing)
 Arkady Vorobyov (Sverdlovsk, weightlifting)
 Ivan Deriuhin, Kiev
 Vitali Romanenko, Poltava Oblast

1960 Summer Olympics
 Gusman Kosanov (Kishinev, athletics)
 Semyon Rzhishchin (Moscow, athletics)
 Viktor Tsybulenko (Kiev, athletics)
 Yury Vlasov (Moscow, weightlifting)
 Arkady Vorobyov (Sverdlovsk, weightlifting)
 Margarita Nikolaeva, Odessa
 Ivan Bohdan, Kyiv

1964 Summer Olympics
 Oleg Fyodoseyev (Moscow, athletics)
 Gusman Kosanov (Alma-Ata, athletics)
 Edvin Ozolin (Leningrad, athletics)
 Oleg Grigoryev (Moscow, boxing)
 Stanislav Stepashkin (Moscow, boxing)
 Volodymyr Morozov (Krasnovodsk, canoeing)
 Grigory Kriss (Kiev, fencing)
 Oleg Stepanov (Moscow, judo)
 Yury Vlasov (Moscow, weightlifting)
 Leonid Zhabotinsky (Odessa, weightlifting)

1968 Summer Olympics
 Hennadiy Bleznitsov (Kharkov, athletics)
 Galina Bukharina (Moscow, athletics)
 Romuald Klim (Minsk, athletics)
 Jānis Lūsis (Riga, athletics)
 Volodymyr Morozov (Kiev, canoeing)
 Valery Yardy (Moscow, cycling)
 Grigory Kriss (Kiev, fencing)
 Viktor Sidyak (Lvov, fencing)
 Eduard Vinokurov (Leningrad, fencing)
 Leonid Zhabotinsky (Kiev, weightlifting)

1972 Summer Olympics
 Nadezhda Besfamilnaya (Moscow, athletics)
 Galina Bukharina (Moscow, athletics)
 Jānis Lūsis (Riga, athletics)
 Veniamin Soldatenko (Alma-Ata, athletics)
 Sergei Belov (Moscow, basketball)
 Ivan Edeshko (Moscow, basketball)
 Alzhan Zharmukhamedov (Moscow, basketball)
 Vyacheslav Lemeshev (Moscow, boxing)
 Volodymyr Morozov (Kiev, canoeing)
 Valery Yardy (Cheboksary, cycling)
 Grigory Kriss (Kiev, fencing)
 Viktor Sidyak (Minsk, fencing)
 Gennadiy Tsygankov (Moscow, ice hockey)
 Eduard Vinokurov (Leningrad, fencing)

1976 Summer Olympics
 Lidiya Alfeyeva (Moscow, athletics)
 Vera Anisimova (Moscow, athletics)
 Jānis Lūsis (Riga, athletics)
 Sergei Belov (Moscow, basketball)
 Ivan Edeshko (Moscow, basketball)
 Alzhan Zharmukhamedov (Moscow, basketball)
 Viktor Sidyak (Minsk, fencing)
 Yevgeni Chernyshov (Moscow, handball)
 Gennadiy Tsygankov (Moscow, ice hockey)
 Vladimir Bure (Moscow, swimming)
 Oleg Moliboga (Dnepropetrovsk, volleyball)
 Eduard Vinokurov (Leningrad, fencing)

1980 Summer Olympics
 Yevgeni Chernyshov (Moscow, handball)
 Anatoli Fedyukin (Moscow, handball)
 Oleg Moliboga, Dnipropetrovsk

1988 Summer Olympics
 Dmitry Bilozerchev (Moscow, artistic gymnastics)
 Hennadiy Avdyeyenko (Odessa, athletics)

Olympians of the Unified Team

1992 Summer Olympics
 Timur Taimazov (weightlifting)

Winter Olympics

1956 Winter Olympics
 Fyodor Terentyev (Moscow, cross-country skiing)
 Nikolay Gusakov (Moscow, Nordic combined)

1960 Winter Olympics
 Vladimir Melanin (Kirov, biathlon)
 Gennady Vaganov (Moscow, cross-country skiing)
 Nikolay Gusakov (Leningrad, Nordic combined)

1964 Winter Olympics
 Vladimir Melanin (Kirov, biathlon)
 Rita Achkina (Moscow, cross-country skiing)
 Yevdokiya Mekshilo (Leningrad, cross-country skiing)
 Gennady Vaganov (Moscow, cross-country skiing)
 Nikolay Gusakov (Leningrad, Nordic combined)
 Nikolay Kiselyov (Leningrad, Nordic combined)

1968 Winter Olympics
 Rita Achkina (Moscow, cross-country skiing)
 Vladimir Voronkov (Moscow, cross-country skiing)
 Vladimir Belussov (Leningrad Oblast, ski jumping)

1972 Winter Olympics
 Vladimir Voronkov (Moscow, cross-country skiing)
 Irina Rodnina (Moscow, figure skating)
 Alexei Ulanov (Moscow, figure skating)

1976 Winter Olympics
 Zinaida Amosova (Novosibirsk, cross-country skiing)
 Nikolay Bazhukov (Syktyvkar, cross-country skiing)
 Sergey Savelyev (Moscow, cross-country skiing)
 Irina Rodnina (Moscow, figure skating)
 Valery Muratov (Kolomna, speed skating)

1980 Winter Olympics

1984 Winter Olympics

1988 Winter Olympics
Vyacheslav Bykov (Moscow, ice hockey)

Overall Olympic performance by the society
In the following table for team events number of team representatives, who received medals are counted, not "one medal for one team", as usual.

Summer Olympics

Winter Olympics

See also
Soviet Union at the Olympics
CSKA Moscow
SKA Leningrad

Sources

Bibliography
 - for tables and lists on 1952-1976 Olympics

External links
 Official website
 Sport committee of friendly armies

 
Sport societies in the Soviet Union
Military sports clubs
Multi-sport clubs in Russia